Serine/threonine-protein phosphatase 1 regulatory subunit 10 is an enzyme that in humans is encoded by the PPP1R10 gene. This gene lies within the major histocompatibility complex class I region on chromosome 6.

Function 

This gene encodes a protein with similarity to a rat protein that has an inhibitory effect on protein phosphatase-1 (PP1). The rat protein localizes to the nucleus and colocalizes with chromatin at distinct phases during mitosis.

References

Further reading